Rise of the Video Game is a five-part series on The Discovery Channel about the history of video games. The first episode aired in November 2007. The series ran under the title I, VIDEOGAME in Europe.

Episodes
"Level One" - Originally broadcast on November 21, 2007. The first computer game, called Tennis for Two, was made in 1958.
"Level Two" - Originally broadcast on November 28, 2007. Super Mario Bros., Sonic the Hedgehog, Donkey Kong, Zelda, King's Quest, Leisure Suit Larry, EA Sports and Grand Theft Auto III are discussed. An insight to home Video game consoles is discussed, including what made the ones that succeeded popular.
"Level Three" - December 5, 2007. This episode discusses three-dimensional video games such as Battlezone and Rescue on Fractalus!, and first-person shooters such as Wolfenstein 3D, Doom, America's Army, and Full Spectrum Warrior.
"Level Four" - December 12, 2007. Simulation games such as Black and White, Sim City and Populous are discussed with their creators such as Will Wright, Peter Molyneux and Sid Meier.
"Level Five" - December 19, 2007. Internet gaming is discussed.

Errors
 The first video game was "Cathode-Ray Tube Amusement Device" in 1947. Followed by "OXO" by Alexander Douglas in 1952, which was the first Video Game to use memory and actual graphics.
 Tennis for Two was not the first computer game. OXO by Alexander Douglas was the first (1952).
 Sierra's second game was not King's Quest. It was The Wizard and the Princess.
 Battlezone was not first first-person game. Night Driver came long before it.
 Battlezone was not what made the Army look into simulation. At the time Battlezone came out Evans and Sutherland already had highly detailed military simulations.
 Rescue on Fractalus! was not the first game to have first-person flight. In home games it was subLogic's Flight Sim.
 Doom did not have a higher frame rate than Wolfenstein 3D. It had a lower frame rate. (Doom was locked at 35 frames per second while Wolfenstein 3D was locked at 70 frames per second, a common vertical refresh rate in displays of that time).
 Graeme Devine did not create Pole Position
 Super Mario Bros. did not introduce Luigi, as he appeared earlier in Mario Bros.

References

Discovery Channel original programming
Documentary television series about video games